Joseph Leeson may refer to:

Joseph Leeson, 1st Earl of Milltown (1701–1783), Irish peer 
Joseph Leeson, 2nd Earl of Milltown (1730–1801), Irish peer, son of the above
Joseph Leeson, 4th Earl of Milltown (1799–1866), Irish peer
Joseph Leeson, 5th Earl of Milltown (1829–1871), Irish peer
Joseph F. Leeson Jr. (born 1955), U.S. District Judge